Hong Kong-based Malaysian singer Gin Lee has released seven studio albums, five EPs, two live albums, 32 singles, and made other appearances as a featured artist. Gin Lee made her Hong Kong debut in 2012 with the EP Here I Come.

Albums

Studio albums

Live albums

Compilation albums

Extended plays

Singles

As main artist 

(*)Still on music chart

"—" denotes a recording that did not chart or was not released to that station

^ Two week number one

As a featured artist

Promotional Singles

References

Discographies of Malaysian artists